Kyzyl-Yar (Qıźılyar) is a rural locality (a village) in Yasherganovsky Selsoviet, Sterlibashevsky District, Bashkortostan, Russia. The population was 71 as of 2010. There is 1 street.

Geography 
Kyzyl-Yar is located 41 km southwest of Sterlibashevo (the district's administrative centre) by road. Maly Buzat is the nearest rural locality.

References 

Rural localities in Sterlibashevsky District